Klaas Bruinsma may refer to:

Klaas Bruinsma (drug lord) (1953–1991), major Dutch drug lord
Klaas Bruinsma (translator) (1931–2018), West Frisian language translator